Jefferson Street Historic District may refer to:

Jefferson Street Historic District (Gary, Indiana)
Jefferson Street Historic District (Iowa City, Iowa), listed on the National Register of Historic Places in Johnson County, Iowa
Jefferson Street Historic District (Brownsville, Tennessee), listed on the National Register of Historic Places in Haywood County, Tennessee
Jefferson Street Historic District (Bluefield, West Virginia), listed on the National Register of Historic Places in Mercer County, West Virginia